Crash Bandicoot is the title character and main protagonist of the Crash Bandicoot series. Introduced in the 1996 video game Crash Bandicoot, Crash is a mutant eastern barred bandicoot who was genetically enhanced by the series' main antagonist Doctor Neo Cortex and soon escaped from Cortex's castle after a failed experiment in the "Cortex Vortex". Throughout the series, Crash acts as the opposition against Cortex and his schemes for world domination. While Crash has a number of offensive maneuvers at his disposal, his most distinctive technique is one in which he spins like a tornado at high speeds and knocks away almost anything that he strikes.

Crash was created by Andy Gavin and Jason Rubin, and was originally designed by Charles Zembillas. Crash was intended to be a mascot character for Sony to use to compete against Nintendo's Mario and Sega's Sonic the Hedgehog. Before Crash was given his name (which stems from the visceral reaction to the character's destruction of boxes), he was referred to as "Willie the Wombat" for much of the duration of the first game's production. Crash has drawn comparisons to mascots such as Mario and Sonic the Hedgehog by reviewers. His animations have been praised, while his voice has faced criticism. He has been redesigned several times throughout many games, which have drawn mixed reactions.

Concept and creation

One of the main reasons Naughty Dog chose to develop Crash Bandicoot (at the time jokingly codenamed "Sonic's Ass Game") for the Sony PlayStation was Sony's lack of an existing mascot character that could compete with Sega's Sonic the Hedgehog and Nintendo's Mario. By this time video game mascots were seen as increasingly unimportant, since they were overshadowed by cross-licensing and the aging games market meant most gamers were too old to find mascots appealing, but Sony were nonetheless interested in covering all bases. Naughty Dog desired to do what Sega and Warner Bros. did with the hedgehog (Sonic) and the Tasmanian devil (Taz) respectively and incorporate an animal that was "cute, real, and no one really knew about". The team purchased a field guide on Tasmanian mammals and selected the wombat, potoroo and bandicoot as options. Andy Gavin and Jason Rubin went with "Willie the Wombat" as a temporary name for the starring character of the game. The name was never meant to be final, due both to the name sounding "too dorky" and to the existence of a non-video game property of the same name. The character was effectively a bandicoot by October 1994, but was still referred to as "Willie the Wombat" because a final name had not been formulated yet. Wanting their mascot game to be multi-dimensional in character depth as well as gameplay, Gavin and Rubin chose not to base Willie around one attribute such as "fast" or "cute". The team felt that Willie should be "goofy and fun-loving, and never talk"; the character's muteness was based on the theory that voices for video game characters were always "lame, negative, and distracted from identification with them."

American Exitus artist Charles Zembillas was hired (alongside environmental artist Joe Pearson) and met with weekly to design and develop Willie and the other characters of the game. It was decided early on that there would be no connection between the real animal and Willie's final design. Instead the design of the character was determined "51% by technical and visual necessity and 49% by inspiration". To determine the color of Willie's fur, Gavin created a list of popular characters and their colors, and then made a list of earthly background possibilities (such as forests, deserts, beaches, etc.). Colors that wouldn't look good on the screen were strictly outlawed, such as red, which would "bleed horribly" on older televisions. Orange was selected as the color of Willie's fur as the last available color. Willie's head was made large and neckless to counter the low resolution of the screen and allow Willie's facial expressions to be discernible. Jason Rubin noted the increased difficulty in turning Willie's head with this type of design. Small details such as the gloves, the spots on Willie's back and a light-colored chest were added to help the player determine what side of Willie was visible based on color. Willie was not given a tail or any flappy straps of clothing due to the PlayStation's inability to properly display such pixels without flickering. The length of Willie's pants was shortened to keep his ankles from flickering as they would with longer pants. Andy Gavin owns the original ink sketches of Crash by Charles Zembillas.

Willie's final game model was made from 512 polygons with the only textures being for the spots on his back and his shoelaces. It took Andy Gavin a month to settle on that number of polygons. Because of the game's use of vertex animation, Willie was capable of more facial expressions than other video game characters at or before the time. Willie's jumping, spinning and bonking mechanisms were refined as the Naughty Dog team developed the levels "Heavy Machinery" and "Generator Room". While preparing for the game's demonstration at the Electronic Entertainment Expo, the team decided to finally rename the titular character "Crash Bandicoot" (the particular name being credited to Dave Baggett and Taylor Kurosaki), with his surname being based on his canonical species and his first name stemming from the visceral reaction to the character's destruction of boxes ("Dash", "Smash" and "Bash" were other potential names). The marketing director of Universal Interactive Studios insisted that the game and character be named "Wez/Wezzy/Wuzzle the Wombat" or "Ozzie the Otzel". The name Crash Bandicoot prevailed after Naughty Dog threatened to leave the production.

After Naughty Dog presented Crash Bandicoot to Sony's Japanese division, the executives of Sony Computer Entertainment Japan stated their dislike of the character and were unimpressed by the renderings of the character made specifically for the meeting. During a break following the initial meeting, Andy Gavin approached Charlotte Francis, the artist responsible for the renderings, and gave her fifteen minutes to close Crash's huge, smiling mouth to make him seem less aggressive, change his eyes from green to "two small black "Pac-Man" shapes" and make his spike of hair smaller. Sony Japan bought Crash Bandicoot for Japanese distribution after being shown the modified printout.

Crash served as a mascot for Sony Computer Entertainment from his creation until September 2000 when Universal Interactive Studios and Konami entered an agreement that would enable Konami to publish a Crash Bandicoot game (which would later become Crash Bandicoot: The Wrath of Cortex) for next-generation game systems, with Universal Interactive handling the production of the games; the agreement served to break the Crash Bandicoot franchise's exclusivity to Sony-produced consoles and effectively made Crash Bandicoot a mascot character for Universal rather than Sony. Crash's game model in Crash Bandicoot: The Wrath of Cortex was composed of approximately 1,800 polygons, which allowed an increase in detail compared to past models, including a more complex and realistic tuft of hair, a visible uvula, stitching on his jeans and shoes and a designer label on his pants.

Upon beginning development of Crash Nitro Kart, Vicarious Visions chief executive officer and chief creative officer Karthik Bala noted that Crash's physical appearance had been inconsistent since his debut in 1996 and decided to "explore the original vision of the character" in an attempt to bring him back to his roots. Charles Zembillas and Joe Pearson were tracked down and enlisted for guidance during development of the game and were faced with the challenge of evolving the character and the franchise visually while retaining their "cartoon-like charm". To redesign Crash and the other mainstay characters of the series for Crash Nitro Kart, the Vicarious Visions team reviewed a number of original development sketches from Zembillas's archives and then redesigned the main characters by incorporating details from the concept art and adding girth to the characters; Crash's appearance in the game, compared to the previous two games, sports a slightly larger nose, fuller eyebrows, and a far more textured body. Zembillas noted that "Crash is slimmer and more appealing now. There's also more emphasis on his eyes, and you can see the craftiness in his personality. That's Crash to me, and he's alive again in Nitro Kart".

Voice portrayal
Crash Bandicoot was originally voiced by Brendan O'Brien from 1996 to 2004; O'Brien called Jason Rubin, who was at the time looking for a voice artist, after Joe Pearson suggested he do so. O'Brien's original work was recorded at a recording studio below the Alfred Hitchcock attraction. The character was later voiced by Chip Chinery in Crash Team Racing and Steve Blum in Crash Nitro Kart. Jess Harnell has been voicing the character since 2005, beginning with Crash Tag Team Racing. In 2020, Scott Whyte voiced the character in Crash Bandicoot 4: It's About Time. Carlos Alazraqui provided his voice in promotional trailers for Cortex Strikes Back.

In the Japanese versions of the games, he was voiced by Kappei Yamaguchi up until the release of Nitro Kart and the Pachislot game CR Crash Bandicoot; and by Makoto Ishii in Crash Boom Bang!. In Skylanders Academy, he is voiced by Eric Rogers and later by Rhys Darby.

Characteristics
Crash was genetically engineered through the use of Cortex and Doctor Nitrus Brio's Evolvo-Ray. Before escaping from Doctor Neo Cortex's island fortress, Crash became romantically attached to a female bandicoot named Tawna, who was another one of Cortex's experiments. Crash's separation from Tawna at the hands of Cortex serves as the primary root of Crash's antagonism of Cortex. Crash is a very emotional character who is quick to laugh and quick to cry. While he has a danger-loving, fearless nature and loves a good fight, he prefers relaxing in the sun and rarely seeks out trouble deliberately. To the ire of his friend Crunch, but the amusement of his sister Coco, Crash is prone to impolite personal habits such as belching or scratching his posterior.

Crash is generally depicted as a mute character, with the frequent exception of exclaiming "Whoa!" upon losing a life. In the Radical Entertainment games, Crash speaks in unintelligible gibberish, but gives a verbal exclamation of excitement in the ending sequence of Crash of the Titans. In the Skylanders Academy web series, he speaks in full sentences with an Australian accent and frequently uses slang. Crash narrates the epilogue of Crash Bandicoot 4: It's About Time in a fully articulate voice that Dalton Cooper of Game Rant described as "Morgan Freeman-esque".

In the beginning of the series, Crash's sole offensive maneuvers were jumping onto his enemies and a distinctive technique in which he spins around like a tornado, kicking away anyone or anything that he strikes. In later games Crash can expand his range of abilities by defeating boss characters. The expanded abilities include a powerful splash, the ability to jump while in the air, the "Death Tornado Spin" (a variation of his spinning technique that allows him to hover through the air for a limited time), a bazooka that fires Wumpa Fruit, increased running speed, the ability to safely tip-toe on top of explosive crates, and the ability to jump at incredibly high heights. The games Crash of the Titans and Crash: Mind over Mutant allow Crash to further expand his offensive abilities with new fighting moves learned from collecting a magical substance known as "Mojo". In Skylanders: Imaginators, Crash has the ability to throw TNT crates, and can use his Yo-yo to bring in enemies to spin attack.

Appearances
As seen in Crash Bandicoot, Crash was once an ordinary eastern barred bandicoot before he was snatched from the wild by Doctor Neo Cortex and subjected to the Evolvo-Ray as part of Cortex's plan to make Crash the "general" of his "Cortex Commandos", which would be used to dominate the world. However, he is later deemed unworthy of being in Cortex's army and escapes from Cortex's castle. As an act of revenge and to rescue a female bandicoot named Tawna, Crash travels through the Wumpa Islands, defeating Cortex's henchmen along the way. He eventually defeats Cortex, steals his airship, and escapes alongside Tawna. A year later in Crash Bandicoot 2: Cortex Strikes Back, Crash is sent off to get a new laptop battery for his sister Coco, but is soon abducted by Cortex, who claims to have changed his ways. Crash is then ordered to gather Crystals for Cortex while fighting off opposition from Doctor Nitrus Brio. Once Cortex reveals his hidden intentions, Crash sends him flying off into space and aids Nitrus Brio in destroying the Cortex Vortex. In Crash Bandicoot: Warped, when the remains of the space station crash into Earth and set the demonic Uka Uka free, Crash is recruited by Aku Aku to use Doctor Nefarious Tropy's Time-Twisting Machine to gather the powerful Crystals in their original places before Cortex does. Crash eventually gathers all 25 Crystals and defeats Nefarious Tropy, causing the Time-Twisting Machine to implode on itself. In Crash Bandicoot: The Wrath of Cortex, Crash is recruited to gather Crystals and return a group of destructive masks named the Elementals to a hibernation state and stop Cortex's new superweapon Crunch Bandicoot. In Crash Twinsanity, after foiling another plot by Doctor Cortex to eliminate him, Crash teams up with Cortex in order to defeat the Evil Twins and restore the natural order of the universe.

In Crash of the Titans, Crash aids Coco in the development of a butter-recycling device. This is interrupted when Neo Cortex arrives and kidnaps Aku Aku and Coco. Crash throws Coco's machine at Cortex's airship, severing the chain holding Aku Aku's cage, which causes the cage to fall into the nearby forest. After Crash rescues Aku Aku, they discover that Cortex and Uka Uka are stealing Mojo from a nearby temple and decide to stop them. Crash is unable to rescue his sister but manages to defeat Cortex, and he begins his search for Coco, interrogating Dingodile, Tiny Tiger, N. Gin, and Uka Uka on her whereabouts. Crash finally confronts and defeats Nina Cortex inside of the Doominator robot, liberates his sister, and averts the destruction of Wumpa Island. Feeling happy for themselves, Crash and his family decide to celebrate their victory with pancakes, which he blurts out (speaking for the first time) in joy. Soon after, in Crash: Mind over Mutant, the NV, a personal digital assistant that everyone must possess, is released to the public. However, this turns out to be a plot by Doctor Cortex and his old partner Doctor Nitrus Brio, who use the NV's Mojo-transmitting powers to control everyone who uses the device. Because Crash is unaffected by the NV, he is able to free his friends from the control of the NV and stop Cortex's and Brio's plot.

Other appearances in the series
Crash appears as a playable character in Team Racing and Bash. The epilogue of Team Racing states that Crash sold his life story, titled "The Color Orange", to a major film studio, set to be released by the Christmas season. In The Huge Adventure, Crash is recruited to gather Crystals to power a device built by Coco that will reverse the effects of Cortex's Planetary Minimizer, which has shrunken the Earth to the size of a grapefruit. In N-Tranced, Crash is awoken from his nap by the kidnapping of Coco and Crunch by Nefarious Tropy and N. Trance. Crash is almost kidnapped himself before being rescued by Aku Aku. He is then sent off to rescue Crunch and Coco, recruit Fake Crash, and defeat N. Trance and Nefarious Tropy. Crash is a playable character in Nitro Kart, in which he is abducted (along with other characters) by Emperor Velo XXVII and forced to compete in the Galaxy Circuit. When Velo relinquishes his power to Crash, Crash seriously considers the possibility of ruling over Velo's empire, but he refuses the offer and leaves Velo with his empire. In Ripto's Rampage, Crash is tricked into thinking that Spyro the Dragon is attacking the Wumpa Islands, but he discovers the truth after a fight on a bridge, and teams up with Spyro to defeat the combined forces of Doctor Neo Cortex and Ripto. In Tag Team Racing, Crash is recruited (along with other characters) by Ebenezer Von Clutch to gather the stolen Power Gems of his amusement park and win the park's ownership. He also finds Von Clutch's lost Black Power Gem by the end of the game. Crash is a playable character in Boom Bang!, in which he interrupts the Viscount's wish to the Super Big Power Crystal and wishes for a vast amount of Wumpa Fruit.

Appearances outside of the series
Crash makes a special guest appearance in Uncharted 4: A Thief's End in a playable recreation of the 'Boulder Dash' level from Crash Bandicoot. Additionally, Crash appears in Skylanders: Imaginators alongside Doctor Neo Cortex as a playable Skylander. Here he is accompanied by Aku Aku, who serves as his translator. Crash also makes recurring appearances in Skylanders Academy, being transported from his own world into the world of Skylands. Unlike his appearance in Skylanders: Imaginators, Aku Aku does not accompany him. Also unlike any of his other appearances, he speaks fluent English with an Australian accent, provided by showrunner Eric Rogers in the first season and by Rhys Darby in the third season. Crash, Coco, Aku Aku, Cortex, and Kapuna-Wa appear in the PlayStation 4 "It's time to play" commercial alongside other gaming characters. Crash and Aku Aku make a cameo appearance in Astro's Playroom.

Cultural impact

Merchandise
Crash has been featured in two series of Crash Bandicoot action figures produced by the now-defunct Resaurus. For Crash Bandicoot 2: Cortex Strikes Back, Resaurus produced a "Jetboard Crash" (a Crash Bandicoot figure bundled with the jetboard seen in the game) and a "Jet Pack Crash" (a goggle-wearing Crash Bandicoot figure bundled with the jet pack seen in the game). The Crash Bandicoot: Warped series featured three different figures of Crash, including one bundled with Aku Aku and Coco Bandicoot figures. A Crash figurine was released as part of the Skylanders: Imaginators starter pack for PlayStation 3 and PlayStation 4 in October 2016; he was made to be playable across all platforms. To promote the series comeback, various shirts, keychains, and other types of merchandise was officially licensed from Activision with Numskull Product Design. Additionally, First 4 Figures plans on producing a Crash Bandicoot statue.

Paleontology
Paleontologists have named an extinct bandicoot from the Miocene of Australia after the character, Crash bandicoot. Although somewhat unusual for the scientific community, the name was used in an entirely unaltered form, without attempting to return to Latin or Greek roots.

Reception

As a mascot character, Crash has drawn numerous comparisons to competing mascots such as Mario and Sonic by reviewers. Dave Halverson of GameFan praised Crash's animations, appearance and mannerisms as "100% perfection". A reviewer for GameRevolution praised Crash's "quirky mannerisms" as "always refreshing", and John Broady of GameSpot described Crash as "disarmingly cute and fuzzy". Doug Perry of IGN was critical of the character, seeing him as "insanely capitalistic", negatively comparing his voice to Luigi of the Mario series and accusing him of being "the most see-through, copycat mascot that ever existed." Louis Bedigian of GameZone also disliked Crash's voice, remarking "it is really annoying to hear a child say, 'Whoa!' every time you fall in the water, especially when you realize that the child's voice is supposed to be Crash". Crash's animations, particularly in Crash Bandicoot: The Wrath of Cortex, have been praised as humorous by reviewers. Ryan Davis of GameSpot analyzed Crash's "overextended running style and self-punishing attacks" as establishing him as an "empty-headed but enthusiastic character", and compared his facial contortions to those of comedian Red Skelton. In a poll held by MSN in late 2008 to determine the most iconic video game character, Crash ranked at #8. In the Guinness World Records Gamer's Edition from 2011, he was voted as the eleventh best video game character. However, he also ranked eighth on IGNs top 10 list of video game characters who should die, adding that it would be a mercy killing. IGN editor Colin Moriarty stated that his games add little to innovate the series over the years, rendering the character useless. In 2021, HobbyConsolas also included Crash on their "The 30 best heroes of the last 30 years." while Rachel Weber of GamesRadar ranked Crash as 8th of their "50 iconic video game characters."

Crash's aesthetic design in the games developed by Radical Entertainment has received mixed reactions from reviewers. Ravi Sinha of GamingBolt considered the design among the worst in video games, noting that the developers should not have tried "to make Crash look 'cool'". Brian Rowe of GameRevolution noted that Crash's fingerless gloves have been replaced with "equally outdated" tribal tattoos and that Crash's personality had been altered from his "obnoxiously extreme attitude" to that of a "bluthering, googly-eyed idiot". Although Rowe wondered when and why the change happened, he concluded that "it's better than the popular goatee-of-rage that so many other platform giants are sporting these days". Arnold Katayev of PSX Extreme, while admitting that the character detail on Crash was "pretty nice", expressed unhappiness with the artistic choices made for the character; he described Crash's tribal tattoos as "a little pretentious" and noted that the increased definition on his mohawk patch made Crash come off as "trying too hard to be cool". He added that Crash's new fighting style begot a stance that consists of Crash "putting up his dukes like a boxer", which he deemed "out of character" for Crash. Finally, while critiquing the voice acting in Crash of the Titans, he remarked that Crash "especially sounds awful, largely because he doesn't actually speak - he just blabs annoying gibberish, which makes him sound like he's an infant". Matt Keller of PALGN also criticized Crash's voice, which he said made Crash sound "like a confused baby". Louis Bedigian of GameZone stated that "Crash's character design has gone from cool to goofy and now to the dreaded place of being dorky" and said that the minute and gradual changes made to Crash's design throughout the series "have really hurt Crash's appearance as a leading game character". GamePro named Crash's new design as the second worst video game character makeover ever. Craig Harris of IGN was more positive on Crash's new appearance and noted that Crash "looks a little floofier and a lot edgier, gaining a spikier Mohawk and trading in his fingerless gloves for tribal ink all up and down his arms" while comparing his incoherent squawking vocalizations to Kazooie of the Banjo-Kazooie series. He concluded that "ultimately he's been changed for the better. He looks a little cooler and more appealing than his more 'Japanese-inspired' edits over the years".

References

External links
 Crash Bandicoot at Crash Mania

Animal characters in video games
Anthropomorphic marsupials
Anthropomorphic video game characters
Crash Bandicoot characters
Fictional racing drivers
Genetically engineered characters in video games
Male characters in video games
Mutant characters in video games
Orphan characters in video games
Sony Interactive Entertainment protagonists
Video game characters who can move at superhuman speeds
Universal Pictures cartoons and characters
Universal Pictures
Video game characters introduced in 1996
Video game mascots
Video game protagonists
Video game superheroes